The 1971 San Jose State Spartans football team represented San Jose State College in the Pacific Coast Athletic Association (PCAA) during the 1971 NCAA University Division football season. Led by second year-head coach Dewey King, they played home games at Spartan Stadium in San Jose, California. With a 55–10 road rout of UC Santa Barbara, the Spartans ended the regular season at an even .500 with five wins, five losses, and one tie (5–5–1, 4–1 PCAA).

This season, San Jose State made its first bowl appearance as a major college program in the Pasadena Bowl. They faced the Memphis State Tigers on Saturday, December 18, but lost 9–28 to finish at 5–6–1.

Schedule

NFL Draft
Two Spartans were selected in the 1972 NFL Draft.

Notes

References

San Jose State
San Jose State Spartans football seasons
San Jose State Spartans football